James Patrick Horner (born ) is an American professional baseball manager and a former minor league baseball player. He was previously the pilot of the Class A Wisconsin Timber Rattlers (2006–2007), High Desert Mavericks (2008–2010; 2013) and Class AA Jackson Generals (2014-2015) all Seattle Mariners affiliates.

He was an assistant coach for the Washington State Cougars baseball team from 2016 to 2019.

Professional playing career
In his nine-year career Horner batted .259 with 116 doubles, six triples, 59 home runs and 298 runs batted in. He threw and batted right-handed.

Managerial career
Horner led the 2009 Mavericks to an 83–57 (.593) record, winning the first- and second-half California League South Division titles. He was named the league's Manager of the Year.  On July 30, 2010, he resigned as High Desert's manager to become assistant baseball coach of Texas Tech University, serving through the 2012 campaign. He then returned to the Mavericks in 2013; he is the winningest manager in the franchise's 23-year history.

As of the start of the 2014 season, his six-year win–loss record as a skipper was 369–434 (.460).

References

External links
Career statistics and player information at Baseball-Reference (Minors).

1973 births
Living people
Baseball players from Washington (state)
Everett AquaSox players
Lancaster JetHawks players
Minor league baseball managers
New Haven Ravens players
Orlando Rays players
People from Snoqualmie, Washington
Peoria Javelinas players
San Antonio Missions players
Tacoma Rainiers players
Wisconsin Timber Rattlers players
Texas Tech Red Raiders baseball coaches
Washington State Cougars baseball coaches